Cool 94.1 (DYVL 94.1 MHz) is an FM station owned and operated by Rizal Memorial Colleges Broadcasting Corporation. Its studios and transmitter are located along San Vicente St., Bogo, Cebu.

References

External links
DYVL FB Page

Radio stations in Cebu
Radio stations established in 2013